Jill Taylor is a character in the TV sitcom Home Improvement.

Jill Taylor may also refer to:
Jill Taylor (model) (born 1951), Playboy model
Jill Bolte Taylor (born 1959), neuroanatomist and author